José Antonio del Castillo Burga (born 1 January 1943) is a Peruvian football forward and coach who played for Peru in the 1970 FIFA World Cup. He also played for Sporting Cristal.

References

External links

1943 births
Peruvian footballers
Peru international footballers
Association football forwards
Sporting Cristal footballers
Sporting Cristal managers
1970 FIFA World Cup players
Living people
Peruvian football managers